Cristóbal Alex is an American lawyer, political operative, and former government official.

Education
Alex received a Juris Doctor degree from the University of Washington School of Law in 2001.

Career 
From 2001-2004, Alex was Law Clerk of the Washington Court of Appeals. From 2014-2019, he was president of Latino Victory. He worked on the Hillary Clinton 2016 presidential campaign as Deputy Director of Voter Outreach and Mobilization.

Alex worked on the Joe Biden 2020 presidential campaign as a Senior Advisor and a member of the Presidential transition of Joe Biden. He was sworn into the Biden administration as Deputy White House Cabinet Secretary on January 20, 2021. He resigned on May 13, 2022.

References 

Biden administration personnel
Activists for Hispanic and Latino American civil rights
Living people
Year of birth missing (living people)
Place of birth missing (living people)
University of Washington School of Law alumni
People from El Paso, Texas